Tyler Schmitt (born March 25, 1986) is a former American football long snapper. He played college football at San Diego State University and was drafted by the Seattle Seahawks in the sixth round of the 2008 NFL Draft. He is considered the first pure long snapper to have been picked in the draft.

College career
He was the Aztecs long snapper for his four seasons at SDSU. He was also a possibility to play as a linebacker for depth purposes. Aztecs punter/holder, Michael Hughes, reported to NFL teams that Schmitt had never given a bad snap in his career.

Professional career

Seattle Seahawks
Schmitt was drafted by the Seattle Seahawks in the sixth round (189th overall) of the 2008 NFL Draft. Schmitt became the first player to solely play long snapper to be selected in the NFL Draft. He was placed on season-ending injured reserve with a back injury on August 26, 2008.

After missing his entire rookie season due to injury, Schmitt was released by the Seahawks on May 1, 2009.

External links
 San Diego State Aztecs bio
 Seattle Seahawks bio
 Photography by Ty Schmitt

References

1986 births
Living people
People from Peoria, Arizona
Sportspeople from the Phoenix metropolitan area
Players of American football from Arizona
American football long snappers
San Diego State Aztecs football players
Seattle Seahawks players